It Happened in New York is a 1935 American musical comedy film directed by Alan Crosland and starring Gertrude Michael, Heather Angel and Lyle Talbot. It is based on a play Bagdad on the Hudson by Ward Morehouse and Jean Dalrymple. A New York taxi driver is hired as a bodyguard to a film star, whose manager is always involving her in publicity stunts.

The film's sets were designed by the art director Charles D. Hall.

Partial cast
 Gertrude Michael as Vania Nardi  
 Heather Angel as Chris Edwards  
 Lyle Talbot as Charley Barnes  
 Hugh O'Connell as Greg Haywood  
 Adrienne D'Ambricourt as Fleurette  
 Rafael Storm as The Phony Prince  
 Robert Gleckler as Venetti  
 Wallis Clark as Joe Blake  
 Phil Tead as Radio Announcer  
 Bess Stafford as Landlady  
 Dick Elliott as Publicity Man  
 Huntley Gordon as Hotel manager  
 Guy Usher as New York Policeman  
 King Baggot as Policeman  
 Phyllis Ludwig as Actress

References

Bibliography
 Monaco, James. The Encyclopedia of Film. Perigee Books, 1991.

External links
 

1935 films
1935 musical comedy films
American musical comedy films
Films directed by Alan Crosland
Universal Pictures films
American black-and-white films
1930s English-language films
1930s American films